Lightning Strikes West is a 1940 American Western film directed by Harry L. Fraser and written by Martha Chapin. The film stars Ken Maynard, Claire Rochelle, Bob Terry, Michael Vallon, Charles King and Reed Howes. The film was released on June 1, 1940, by Colony Pictures.

Plot

Cast           
Ken Maynard as Lightning Ken Morgan
Claire Rochelle as Mae Grant
Bob Terry as Tad Grant 
Michael Vallon as Butch Taggart
Charles King as Joe Lakin
Reed Howes as Frank 
Dick Dickinson as Mack 
George Chesebro as Sheriff
John Elliott as Dr. Jenkins
William Gould as Marshal Jim Correy

References

External links
 

1940 films
1940s English-language films
American Western (genre) films
1940 Western (genre) films
Films directed by Harry L. Fraser
1940s American films